Odda may refer to:

Places
Odda, a municipality in Hordaland county, Norway
Odda (town), a town in Odda municipality, Hordaland county, Norway
Odda Church, a church in the town of Odda in Norway
Odda's Chapel, a surviving Anglo-Saxon church at Deerhurst in Gloucestershire, England

People
Odda of Deerhurst, an Anglo-Saxon nobleman active in the period from 1013 onwards
Odda, Ealdorman of Devon, an Anglo-Saxon Ealderman fl. 878

Other
Odda FK, a football club based in the town of Odda in Norway
Odda Nyhetsblad, a newspaper was used to be published in the town of Odda, Norway
Odda Rutebuss, a bus company in Odda, Norway
Carmenta odda, a moth of the family Sesiidae
Odda process is another name for the Nitrophosphate process